Lucien Muller-Schmidt (born 3 September 1934) is a French former football player and manager who played as a midfielder.

He was part of France at FIFA World Cup 1966 but did not play any match.

Career
Born in Bischwiller, Muller started out in Alsace, his native region, and then made a name for himself with the Stade de Reims, with whom he was twice crowned French champion. He then moved to Real Madrid, with whom he played in the European Cup final in 1964 and won the league three times. He later moved to FC Barcelona. Although he was touted as the successor to Raymond Kopa, his performances in the blaugrana shirt never matched his club performances. He was nevertheless part of the French team that participated in the 1966 FIFA World Cup. He returned to Reims at the end of his career.

He briefly returned to Barcelona as a coach in the late 1970s, leading the club to the European Cup Winners' Cup Final, before being replaced by Joaquim Rifé. He later on trained AS Monaco, RCD Mallorca and CD Castellón.

External links
 Racing Club de Strasbourg profile 
 FFF profile 
 
 

1934 births
Living people
People from Bischwiller
French people of German descent
Sportspeople from Bas-Rhin
French footballers
Footballers from Alsace
Association football midfielders
Ligue 1 players
RC Strasbourg Alsace players
Toulouse FC players
Stade de Reims players
La Liga players
Real Madrid CF players
FC Barcelona players
France international footballers
1960 European Nations' Cup players
1966 FIFA World Cup players
French football managers
Burgos CF (1936) managers
AS Monaco FC managers
La Liga managers
CD Castellón managers
Real Zaragoza managers
FC Barcelona managers
RCD Mallorca managers
French expatriate footballers
French expatriate football managers
French expatriate sportspeople in Spain
Expatriate footballers in Spain
Expatriate football managers in Spain